The Ettedgui Synagogue is a synagogue in the medina of Casablanca, Morocco. It was rededicated by King Mohammed VI of Morocco on December 20, 2016, after it was restored. A government grant of about $844,000 funded the restorations, according to the Maghreb Arab Press.

Next to it, there is a museum dedicated to the Mellah, or Jewish quarter, of Casablanca.

History 
It was one of the most important Jewish sites in the city, next to another synagogue called the Synagogue of the People of Essaouira. The Ettedgui Synagogue was destroyed in the Allied bombardment during the Naval Battle of Casablanca in November 1942. Reconstruction began in 2011, over a half century after its destruction.

References

Jews and Judaism in Casablanca
Religious buildings and structures in Casablanca
Synagogues in Morocco